Safety in Numbers is the third studio album by American rock band Crack the Sky, released on LP in October 1978 (see 1978 in music) by Lifesong Records (catalog #JZ 35041). It is the band's highest charting release on the Billboard album chart, peaking at No. 126.

This album is markedly different from the previous two Crack The Sky releases, being largely written by Rick Witkowski with Joe Macre and Rob Stevens. Keyboardist/vocalist John Palumbo, who had previously composed all of Crack The Sky's material, departed the band early in the recording process for Safety in Numbers.  Consequently, Palumbo is not credited as a band member on the finished album, though the re-organized group did end up using three of his songs (one a co-write with several other Crack The Sky members).

To replace Palumbo, the band recruited Gary Lee Chappell to sing, and producer Rob Stevens to play keyboards. However, only the original band members (Joey D'Amico, Joe Macre, Jim Griffiths, Rick Witkowski) are pictured on the back cover of the album, with Chappell and Stevens relegated to one small photo each on the inside sleeve. There was a tour in support of the album (documented on Live Sky and Alive and Kickin' Ass), after which the band folded.

In 1980, Palumbo and guitarist Rick Witkowski started a new version of the band and released White Music.  Crack The Sky has continued recording ever since; Safety in Numbers remains their only studio album that does not feature Palumbo as lead vocalist/chief songwriter.

Track listing

Personnel

Musicians
Joey D'Amico – Percussion, back-up vocals, lead vocals ("Long Nights")
Jim Griffiths – Electric and acoustic guitar, back-up vocals
Joe Macre – Electric and synthesized bass guitar, Moog pedals, back-up vocals
Rick Witkowski – Electric and acoustic guitars, Mellotron, back-up vocals
Gary Lee Chappell – Lead vocals, back-up vocals, acoustic guitar
Rob Stevens – Piano, Minimoog, Oberheim synthesizer

Production
Producer – Rob Stevens
Terry Cashman – Executive producer
Tommy West – Executive Producer
Nick Blagona – Engineer
Bernard Dubouc – Assistant engineer
George Marino – Mastering

Additional credits
Recorded and mixed at Le Studio, Morin Heights, Quebec, Ontario, Canada
Mastered at Sterling Sound, New York City
Jay Maisel – Cover photo
Don Hunstein – Inner sleeve photo
Tom Hill – Inner sleeve photo
Sandy Speiser – Back cover photo
Gerard Huerta – Hand lettering
John Berg – Cover design
Nancy Greenberg – Cover design
Susan Senk – Production coordinator
Bobby Baker – Personal management (for Cellar Door Management, Inc., Washington, D.C.)
Alan Hecht – Artist development
LSR Strings – Acoustic guitar strings
Vince DePaul – Keyboards (on tour)
Danny Palumbo – Road Manager / majordomo]

Alternate versions
In 1989, Lifesong released a CD pairing Safety in Numbers with Animal Notes on a single disc (LSCD-8803). To fit both albums on one CD, the song "Prelude to Safety in Numbers" was omitted.

Sources
LP and CD liner notes

1978 albums
Crack the Sky albums
Albums recorded at Le Studio